Barwa is a village in West Champaran district in the Indian state of Bihar. It is located in the Narkatiaganj block.

Demographics
 India census, Barwa had a population of 1943 in 345 households. Males constitute 52.7% of the population and females 47.2%. Barwa has an average literacy rate of 41.53%, lower than the national average of 74%: male literacy is 66%, and female literacy is 33%. In Barwa, 21.25% of the population is under 6 years of age.

References

Villages in West Champaran district